Foursome  may refer to:

Foursome (golf), a type of golf match
Foursome (group sex), group sex involving four people
Foursome (2006 TV series), an American adult reality dating series on Playboy TV
Foursome (2016 TV series), an American romantic comedy web series
The Foursome, a 2006 American/Canadian comedy film
Foursome of Nine Dragon Island, fictional characters in the ancient Chinese novel Investiture of the Gods
Wild Things: Foursome, the fourth film in the Wild Things franchise